Franco Miguel Faría (born September 29, 1995 in Santa Fe, Argentina) is an Argentine professional footballer who currently plays for Atlético de Rafaela.

References

External links
 

1995 births
Living people
Argentine footballers
Argentine expatriate footballers
Association football midfielders
Unión de Santa Fe footballers
9 de Julio de Morteros players
Unión de Sunchales footballers
Venados F.C. players
Alebrijes de Oaxaca players
Mushuc Runa S.C. footballers
Central Norte players
Atlético de Rafaela footballers
Primera Nacional players
Torneo Federal A players
Ascenso MX players
Ecuadorian Serie A players
Argentine expatriate sportspeople in Mexico
Argentine expatriate sportspeople in Ecuador
Expatriate footballers in Mexico
Expatriate footballers in Ecuador